Henry Myer Phillips (June 30, 1811 – August 28, 1884) was a Democratic member of the U.S. House of Representatives from Pennsylvania.  He was Pennsylvania's second Jewish congressman.

Life 
Phillips was born in Philadelphia. He attended the Philadelphia schools and Franklin Institute.  He studied law, was admitted to the bar in 1832 and commenced practice in Philadelphia. He served as clerk of the Philadelphia County Court of Common Pleas.

Phillips was elected as a Democrat to the Thirty-fifth Congress.  He was an unsuccessful candidate for reelection in 1858.  He was a delegate to the 1860 Democratic National Convention.

He resumed the practice of law in Philadelphia.  He served as a trustee of Jefferson Medical College in 1862.  He was appointed a member of the Board of Fairmount Park Commissioners in 1867 and elected its president in 1881.  He was a member of the Board of City Trusts in 1869, vice president of the board 1870–1878, and president 1878–1882.  He served as a director of the Academy of Music in 1870 and its president in 1872, resigning in 1884. He was elected as a member to the American Philosophical Society in 1871.

Phillips was a member of the commission to supervise the erection of the municipal buildings in Philadelphia in 1870, resigning in 1871.  He was a director of the Pennsylvania Railroad Company in 1874.

Death 
Phillips died in Philadelphia in 1884 and interment was in Mount Sinai Cemetery in Frankford, Philadelphia, Pennsylvania. Henry M. Phillips Masonic Lodge #337 in Monongahela, PA is named in his honor.

See also
List of Jewish members of the United States Congress

Sources

The Political Graveyard

External links 
 

1811 births
1884 deaths
Politicians from Philadelphia
Pennsylvania lawyers
Democratic Party members of the United States House of Representatives from Pennsylvania
Jewish members of the United States House of Representatives
19th-century American politicians
19th-century American lawyers